Le Chevalier can refer to:

 Le Chevalier (restaurant), Michelin starred restaurant in Delft, Netherlands
 Le Chevalier D'Eon, a 24-episode anime television series